The Norwegian Directorate of Fisheries is a Norwegian government agency. On 1 January 2014 it was incorporated into the new Ministry of Trade, Industry and Fisheries formerly under the Ministry of Fisheries and Coastal Affairs.

Established in 1900, it is responsible for advising and executing the ministry's policy. It formerly conducted research, but the Institute of Marine Research was split out in 1989. The organization consists of a headquarters in Bergen, seven regional offices and more than twenty local offices spread around the country.

Heads of the Directorate have been Gabriel Westergaard and Jens O. Dahl (1900–1906), Johan Hjort (1906–1918), Sigurd Asserson (1918–1937), H.J. Salvesen (1938–1945), Ola Brynjelsen (1945–1948), Klaus Sunnanå (1948–1973), Knut Vartdal (1973–1978), Hallstein Rasmussen (1978–1988), Viggo Jan Olsen (1988–1996) and
Peter Gullestad (1996–2008), Liv Holmefjord (2008–2020) and Frank Bakke-Jensen (2021–present).

References

Fisheries
Government agencies established in 1900
Organisations based in Bergen
1900 establishments in Norway
Fishing in Norway